The Netherlands competed at the 2016 Summer Paralympics in Rio de Janeiro, Brazil, from 7 September to 18 September 2016. The first places the team qualified were for four athletes in equestrian team dressage. In September 2015, a representative from the country attended the Rio 2016 Paralympic Games Chef de Mission seminar as part of the country's preparation efforts for the 2016 Games.

Medalists 
The following Dutch competitors won medals at the Games. In the 'by discipline' sections below, medallists' names are in bold.

| width="78%" align="left" valign="top" |

| width="22%" align="left" valign="top" |

Athletics

The Netherlands competed in athletics at the 2016 Summer Paralympics.

Men
Track & road events

Field events

Women
Track & road events

Field events

Boccia

Cycling

Equestrian

The Netherlands were one of three nations to qualify a team for dressage via their results at the 2014 FEI World Equestrian Games, where they won the silver medal in the team event.

Individual

Team

Football 7-a-side football

Men's tournament

Netherlands national 7-a-side football team qualified for the Rio Paralympics as a result of the Regional Qualifier Allocation by virtue of being runners-up at 2014 European Championships while being ranked in the top 8 at the 2015 World Championships.

The draw for the tournament was held on May 6 at the 2016 Pre Paralympic Tournament in Salou, Spain. The Netherlands was put into Group B with the United States, Argentina and Russia. Iran qualified for the 2016 Rio Games following the suspension of Russia. The IPC ruled that there could not be a redraw for the groups. This resulted in Iran being put into Group A with the Netherlands, Argentina and the United States.

The tournament where the Paralympic draw took place featured 7 of the 8 teams participating in Rio.  It was the last major preparation event ahead of the Rio Games for all teams participating.  The Netherlands finished third, after winning 2 - 3 against Great Britain in the 3rd place match.

Going into the Rio Games, the country was ranked fourth in the world.

Group B

Semi final

Bronze medal game

Powerlifting

The Netherlands had qualified one powerlifter into the Paralympic tournaments for the first time since the 2000 Summer Paralympics.

Women

Rowing 

The Netherlands had qualified three rowers into the Paralympic tournaments.

Men

Mixed

Sailing

The Netherlands qualified two sailers into the Paralympic Tournament. In the SKUD 18 event, the Netherlands earned a quota spot with a fourth-place finish overall and the first country who had not qualified via the 2014 Championships.  The boat was crewed by Rolf Schrama and Sandra Nap.

Sitting volleyball

Women
Group A

Classification 5th / 6th

Swimming

The Netherlands had qualified nineteen swimmers into the Paralympic tournaments.

Men

Women

Table tennis

The Netherlands had qualified four table tennis players into the Paralympic tournaments.

Men

Women

Wheelchair basketball

Men's tournament
The Netherlands men's national wheelchair basketball team had qualified for the 2016 Rio Paralympics.

During the draw, Brazil chose of which group they wanted to be in. They were partnered with Spain, who were in the group Brazil did not select. Brazil chose Group B, which included Iran, the United States, Great Britain, Germany and Algeria. That left Spain in Group A with Australia, Canada, Turkey, the Netherlands and Japan.
Group A

Quarterfinal

7th/8th place playoff

Women's tournament
The Netherlands women's national wheelchair basketball team had qualified for the 2016 Rio Paralympics.

As hosts, Brazil chose which group they were put into. They were partnered with Algeria, who were put in the group they did not chose. Brazil chose Group A, which included Canada, Germany, Great Britain and Argentina. Algeria ended up in Group B with the United States, the Netherlands, France and China.
Group B

Quarterfinal

Semi-final

Bronze medal game

Wheelchair tennis 
The Netherlands qualified two competitors in the men's single event and four in the women's singles event.

Singles

Doubles

See also
Netherlands at the 2016 Summer Olympics

References

Nations at the 2016 Summer Paralympics
2016
2016 in Dutch sport